Paya may refer to:

Places
 Paya, Boyacá, a municipality in the department of Boyacá, Colombia
 Paya, Dominican Republic, a municipal district of the Baní municipality
 Paya, India, a town in Arunachal Pradesh state of India
 Paya Jaras, a state constituency in Malaysia
 Paya, Kyain Seikgyi, a village in Kayin State, Myanmar
 Paya, Darién, Panama

Other
 Paya, Inc., a payments processing company
 Paya (food), a spicy meat stew native to Pakistan and North India
 Paya language, the language spoken by the Pech
 Pech people, an indigenous tribe of Honduras previously known as the Paya
 Oswaldo Payá (1952–2012), Cuban politician